Teri McMinn (born August 18, 1951) is an American actress and model, known for her role as Pam in The Texas Chain Saw Massacre (1974).

Life and career 
McMinn was born and raised in Houston, Texas, and grew up with an interest in the arts. After graduating high school, she was on scholarship with The Dallas Theatre Center, in Dallas, Texas. Moving to Austin, Texas for further study, the actress attended the University of Texas and St. Edward's University in Austin, Texas.

She was discovered by Tobe Hooper and Kim Henkel, director and producer (respectively) of The Texas Chain Saw Massacre, after seeing an article about her in the local newspaper. After auditioning, Teri was offered the role of "Pam" in their film project. Pam was a teenager traveling with Sally Hardesty and her brother Franklin to visit the grave of the Hardestys' grandfather to investigate reports of vandalism and grave robbing. On their way, they fall victim to a family of cannibals. Her most memorable scene was being hung on a meat hook by Leatherface (played by Gunnar Hansen), the antagonist.

Following the arduous film shoot, Teri continued acting in regional theater in Texas and the Midwest. After the film’s 1974 release, she studied acting in Los Angeles and New York City, was a leg and foot model, did commercials and print work, and continued her work in theater.

At Monster Mania Horror Convention in 2008, in Cherry Hill, New Jersey, Teri made a personal appearance as "Pam, the girl on the meat hook", in a cast reunion. In September 2008, the new 4-set hi-definition DVD release of the movie contained an interview with her about the making and release of the film. On August 6, 2009 she was a special guest at the Carnival of Darkness. She attended Son of Monsterpalooza in Burbank, California from September 12 to 14, 2014.

She now lives in California and continues to please fans by attending occasional horror film events.

Filmography

References

External links
 
 Interview with Teri McMinn

1951 births
Living people
American film actresses
Actresses from Houston
University of Texas at Austin alumni
20th-century American actresses
21st-century American women